The Whistler is an American radio mystery drama which ran from May 16, 1942, until September 22, 1955, on the west-coast regional CBS radio network. The show was also broadcast in Chicago and over Armed Forces Radio. On the west coast, it was sponsored by the Signal Oil Company: "That whistle is your signal for the Signal Oil program, The Whistler." There were also two short-lived attempts to form east-coast broadcast spurs: July 3 to September 25, 1946, sponsored by the Campbell Soup Company; and March 26, 1947, to September 29, 1948, sponsored by Household Finance. The program was also adapted into a film noir series by Columbia Pictures in 1944.

Characters and story

Each episode of The Whistler began with the sound of footsteps and a person whistling. (The Saint radio series with Vincent Price used a similar opening.) The haunting signature theme tune was composed by Wilbur Hatch and featured Dorothy Roberts whistling with an orchestra.

A character known only as the Whistler was the host and narrator of the tales, which focused on crime and fate. He often commented directly upon the action in the manner of a Greek chorus, taunting the characters, guilty or innocent, from an omniscient perspective. The stories followed a formula in which a person's criminal acts were typically revealed either by an overlooked but important detail or by the criminal's own stupidity. An ironic ending, often grim, was a key feature of each episode. But on rare occasions, such as "Christmas Bonus" broadcast on Christmas Day 1944, the plot's twist of fate caused the story to end happily for the protagonist.

Bill Forman, a veteran radio announcer, had the title role of the Whistler for the longest period of time. Others who portrayed the Whistler at various times were Gale Gordon, Joseph Kearns, Marvin Miller (announcer for the show, who occasionally filled in for Forman and played supporting roles), and Bill Johnstone (who had the title role on radio's The Shadow from 1938 to 1943). Cast members included Betty Lou Gerson, Hans Conried, Joseph Kearns, Cathy Lewis, Elliott Lewis, Gerald Mohr, Lurene Tuttle and Jack Webb.

Writer-producer J. Donald Wilson established the tone of the show during its first two years, and he was followed in 1944 by producer-director George Allen. Other directors included Sterling Tracy and Sherman Marks with final scripts by Joel Malone and Harold Swanton. Of the 692 episodes, over 200 no longer exist. In 1946, a local Chicago version of The Whistler with local actors (including Everett Clarke as the Whistler) aired Sundays on WBBM, sponsored by Meister Brau beer.

Films and television

Films
The Whistler was adapted into a film noir series of eight films by Columbia Pictures. The "Voice of the Whistler" was provided by an uncredited Otto Forrest. In the first seven films, veteran actor Richard Dix played the main character in the story—a different character in each film. In the eighth film, made after Dix's retirement, Michael Duane played the main character.

 The Whistler – 1944, directed by William Castle
 The Mark of the Whistler – 1944, directed by William Castle
 The Power of the Whistler – 1945, directed by Lew Landers
 Voice of the Whistler – 1945, directed by William Castle
 Mysterious Intruder – 1946, directed by William Castle
 The Secret of the Whistler – 1946, directed by George Sherman
 The Thirteenth Hour – 1947, directed by William Clemens
 The Return of the Whistler – 1948, directed by D. Ross Lederman

Television
A syndicated TV version of The Whistler was produced and aired for a brief period in 1954. The Whistler was voiced by William Forman.

Cultural references
The Whistler was parodied in a 1964 episode of The Jack Benny Program titled "I Am the Fiddler" (season 14, episode 28).

In the 1990 film The Two Jakes, set in Los Angeles in the late 1940s, the opening narrative of The Whistler can be heard on the car radio as private detective J.J. Gittes (played by Jack Nicholson) cruises the streets.

See also
 Audio theatre
 The Mysterious Traveler
 Old-time radio

References

Bibliography
 Dunning, John. On the Air: The Encyclopedia of Old Time Radio. Oxford University Press, 1998. .
 Nachman, Gerald. Raised on Radio. University of California Press, 2000. .
 Pitts, Michael R. Famous Movie Detectives II. Rowman & Littlefield, 1991. .
 Renzi, Thomas C. Cornell Woolrich: From Pulp Noir to Film Noir. McFarland Publishing, 2006. .
 Van Neste, Dan. " The Whistler: Stepping Into the Shadows – A Columbia Film Series". BearManor Media, 2011. .
 Wilt, David E. Hardboiled in Hollywood. Popular Press, 1991. .

External links
 The Whistler at the OTR Network Library (79 radio episodes)
 The Whistler at the Internet Archive (450 radio episodes)

1940s American radio programs
1950s American radio programs
American radio dramas
Film noir
Films directed by William Castle
Film series introduced in 1944
1954 American television series debuts
1955 American television series endings
1950s American animated television series
CBS Radio programs